Mount Willis is a mountain 2 nautical miles (3.7 km) south of Mount Chalmers in the southern part of the Conway Range. Mapped by the United States Geological Survey (USGS) from tellurometer surveys and Navy air photos, 1959–63. Named by Advisory Committee on Antarctic Names (US-ACAN) for Lieutenant Commander Charles H. Willis, U.S. Navy, commander of USS Wilhoite on ocean station duty in support of aircraft flights between Christchurch and McMurdo Sound during U.S. Navy Operation Deepfreeze 1961.

Mountains of Oates Land